Armand Schiele (born 7 June 1967 in Colmar) is a French former alpine skier. He competed in the men's super-G at the 1992 Winter Olympics.

External links
 sports-reference.com
 

1967 births
Living people
French male alpine skiers
Olympic alpine skiers of France
Alpine skiers at the 1992 Winter Olympics
Sportspeople from Colmar
20th-century French people